Water Resources Research is a peer-reviewed scientific journal published by the American Geophysical Union, covering research in the social and natural sciences of water. The editor-in-chief is Georgia Destouni (Stockholm University), who took over from Martyn Clark (2017-2020).

According to the Journal Citation Reports, the journal has a 2020 impact factor of 5.240.

Water Resources Research was begun in 1965, with Walter B. Langbein and Allen V. Kneese as its founding editors.

References

External links 
 

English-language journals
American Geophysical Union academic journals
Wiley (publisher) academic journals
Monthly journals
Publications established in 1965
Environmental social science journals
Hydrology journals